This is a list of Croatian football transfers for the 2008–09 winter transfer window. Only moves featuring at least one Prva HNL club are listed. The winter transfer window officially opened on 1 January 2009, although transfers may have taken place prior to that date. The window closed at midnight on 31 January 2009.

Transfers

Transfers Winter 2008-09
2008–09
Croatian